Chyortovo or Chertovo may refer to:
Lake Chyortovo, a lake in Yamalo-Nenets Autonomous Okrug, Russia
Chertovo Gorodishche, a rock formation in Sverdlovsk Oblast, Russia
Chyortovo koleso, a 1926 Soviet film